Pinoso, officially El Pinós/Pinoso (in Valencian and Spanish) is a traditional town which sits located in the mountainous countryside of the Alicante/Murcia border (at some 56 km from Alacant). This traditional town is renowned for the production of fine wines, rock salt and marble. Pinoso has a population of 7,300 and a municipal area of 126 km2. Recently it has experienced a growth in tourism: since the coast line has virtually no more room for new residentials, these are moving inland into the province.

There are 10 minor local entities within the municipality area: El Rodriguillo, Culebró, Les Enzebres, Ubeda, Cases d'Ibáñez or Les Casetes, Lel, Cases del Pi, El Paredó, La Cavallussa and Tresfonts.

Notable people
 José Mira Mira (1944–2008), Spanish scientist.
 Pedro Solbes Mira (1942–2023), Spanish politician, former minister of economic affairs, of Spain, and also former European commissioner for economic and monetary affairs in the European Commission (European Union).

References

External links
 
 Pinoso in English

Municipalities in the Province of Alicante
Vinalopó Mitjà